ACPU may refer to:

 Auxiliary Computer Power Unit, for the Gemini Guidance Computer
 Aircell Central Processor Unit, by Aircell
 Alignment control panel, in the Glossary of military abbreviations
 Airborne Central Processing Unit

See also
 CPU (disambiguation)